Sir Andrew Baynton (c. 1516–1564) was an English scholar.

Baynton was son and heir of Sir Edward Baynton, of Bromham, Wiltshire, a favourite courtier of Henry VIII, vice-chamberlain to three of his queens, and a friend and patron of Hugh Latimer, some of the correspondence between them (ca. 1530) being printed in Foxe's Book of Martyrs.

Baynton, born in 1515–6, was placed by his father to study French under John Palsgrave, the court tutor, and wrote a prefatory letter to his master's book, L'esclaircissement de la langue francaise (1530). About the same time he attended Knyvett on his embassy from Henry to the emperor.

Succeeding his father (ca. 1544), he was returned to Parliament for Marlborough in 1545, Horsham in 1547, Westbury in Oct 1553, Marlborough again in 1555, and Calne in 1558–9.

Bayton married, first, Phillipa Brulet; after annulment in 1562, he married Frances Lee and they had one daughter, Anne. She did not inherit because Andrew had entailed the Baynton estates to his brother Edward (1517–1593).

References

1510s births
People from Wiltshire
English academics
16th-century scholars
English MPs 1545–1547
English MPs 1547–1552
English MPs 1553 (Mary I)
English MPs 1555
English MPs 1559
Members of the Parliament of England for constituencies in Wiltshire
1564 deaths